No Way! is the fifth album by guitarist Boogaloo Joe Jones which was recorded in 1970 and released on the Prestige label.

Reception

Allmusic awarded the album 3 stars calling it "a set of pretty funky early-'70s soul-jazz".

Track listing 
All compositions by Boogaloo Joe Jones except where noted
 "No Way" - 7:16
 "If You Were Mine" (Jimmy Lewis) - 4:48
 "Georgia On My Mind" (Hoagy Carmichael, Stuart Gorrell) - 5:59
 "Sunshine Alley" (Butch Cornell) - 7:09
 "I'll Be There" (Berry Gordy, Bob West, Willie Hutch, Hal Davis) - 4:02
 "Holdin' Back" - 6:45

Personnel 
 Boogaloo Joe Jones - guitar
 Grover Washington Jr. - tenor saxophone
 Sonny Phillips - organ, electric piano (tracks 1,2,3 & 5)
 Butch Cornell - organ (tracks 4 & 6)
 Jimmy Lewis - electric bass
 Bernard Purdie - drums

References 

Boogaloo Joe Jones albums
1971 albums
Prestige Records albums
Albums recorded at Van Gelder Studio
Albums produced by Bob Porter (record producer)